William G. O'Neill (February 14, 1921 – May 24, 1996) was an American politician. He served as a Democratic member of the Florida House of Representatives.

Life and career 
O'Neill was born in Arcadia, Florida. He attended the University of Florida and the University of Florida School of Law.

In 1957, O'Neill was elected to the Florida House of Representatives, serving until 1966.

O'Neill died in May 1996, at the age of 75.

References 

1921 births
1996 deaths
People from Arcadia, Florida
Democratic Party members of the Florida House of Representatives
20th-century American politicians
University of Florida alumni
Fredric G. Levin College of Law alumni